Museu da Loucura (Museum of Madness), formerly known as Hospital Colônia was a psychiatric hospital founded in 1903. The institution was located in the Brazilian city of Barbacena, Minas Gerais. From its foundation to 1980, Colônia was theater of a genocide. Official estimates report over 60,000 deaths occurred inside the wards due to medical malpractice and torture over the years. Italian Psychiatrist Franco Basaglia compared the place to a Nazi concentration camp. In 2013, Brazilian journalist Daniela Arbex released an investigative book called O Holocausto Brasileiro (The Brazilian Holocaust) telling the stories of survivors and victims. The events inside Colônia were also a boost for the national anti-asylum movement.

About 

Hospital Colônia (Colony, in Brazilian Portuguese) was founded in 1903 and its first director was Dr. Joaquim Antônio Dutra. Colônia had capacity to give shelter to 200 patients. Located in the city of Barbacena, 102 miles away from the capital of the State of Minas Gerais, Belo Horizonte and in the heart of the Mantiqueira Mountains, the place became a national symbol of psychiatric care in the 20th century. Those who required medical attention were sent by train to Barbacena from all Brazil. Those transports were so common they originated the regional expression "trem de doido" ("crazy train").

By 1960, Colônia was operating heavily over capacity and had over 5,000 patients. Most of them were always partially dressed, some were fully naked and forced to labor, including children, elders and people with disabilities. At least 16 people perished everyday due to sickness, malnutrition, heat shock due to exposure to low temperatures and Scottish showers, electroconvulsive therapy or murder. The staff benefited from remains of the dead patients, as they were often smuggled to universities across the country. Whenever the demand was low, corpses were simply dissolved in acid or buried in nearby grounds. Over 70% of the patients were never diagnosed with any sort of psychological disorder; they were placed under permanent care by political interests and social stigma.  These patients were often alcoholics, epileptics, prostitutes, homosexuals, unwanted children, homeless people, women whose virginity was lost before marriage, enemies of the local elite or simply considered "inadequate" according to the social norms of the past century, such as shy men and women with a sense of leadership. It is also notorious for the fact that a significant proportion of the population in Colônia was of African ancestry.

In 1980, due to pressure in the mass media, the national anti-asylum movement managed to shut down the institution and transfer the very few survivors to be placed under proper care while receiving indemnification from the state.

By 1996, it was turned into "Museu da Loucura" (Brazilian Portuguese: Museum of Madness).

See also 
 Brazilian anti-asylum movement
 Genocide of Barbacena

References

External links 
 Hospital Colônia on Portuguese Wikipedia
 Museu da Loucura on Portuguese Wikipedia
 Brazilian Psychiatry Museum on Hospital Colônia (Portuguese only)

1903 establishments in Brazil
Human rights abuses in Brazil
Museums in Minas Gerais
Medical museums in Brazil
Former psychiatric hospitals